Maranoa was a Legislative Assembly electorate in the state of Queensland.

History

Maranoa of the original sixteen electorates established in 1859. Geographically it was based on the Balonne River catchment area, including the towns of Roma and St George. Despite various redistributions over the years, the electorate remained in the same general vicinity until its abolition in 1949 when most of it was included in the resurrected Electoral district of Balonne.

Members
The members who represented the electorate were:

See also
 Electoral districts of Queensland
 Members of the Queensland Legislative Assembly by year
 :Category:Members of the Queensland Legislative Assembly by name

References

Former electoral districts of Queensland
Constituencies established in 1863
Constituencies disestablished in 1950
1863 establishments in Australia
1950 disestablishments in Australia